China Art Museum, formerly Zhoujiadu; is a station on Line 8 of the Shanghai Metro. The station opened on September 28, 2012, a few days before the opening of the China Art Museum, housed in the former China Pavilion at Expo 2010. It is the first station in Pudong when travelling southbound on Line 8.

Around the station
 China Art Museum
 The River Mall
 Mercedes-Benz Arena

Railway stations in Shanghai
Line 8, Shanghai Metro
Shanghai Metro stations in Pudong
Railway stations in China opened in 2012
Pudong